Innbygda is a village in the municipality of Selbu in Trøndelag county, Norway. The village is home to some small industries including a sawmill and a Tine factory.

References

Selbu
Villages in Trøndelag